The Knickerbocker Buckaroo is a 1919 American silent Western/romantic comedy film directed by Albert Parker and starring Douglas Fairbanks, who also wrote (under the pseudonym Elton Thomas) and produced the film. The Knickerbocker Buckaroo is now considered lost.

Synopsis
Fairbanks plays a hedonistic New York City aristocrat who tries to change his selfish ways by heading to Sonora, Texas to carry out a campaign of altruism.  Along the way, he is mistaken for a Mexican bandit and is pursued by a corrupt sheriff who is in pursuit of the bandit's hidden fortune.

Production background
The Knickerbocker Buckaroo was Fairbanks' last film under his contract with Paramount Pictures.  After this production, he worked exclusively at United Artists, a company he co-founded in 1919 with Mary Pickford, Charles Chaplin, and D. W. Griffith.

Cast
 Douglas Fairbanks as Teddy Drake
 Marjorie Daw as Rita Allison
 William A. Wellman as Henry (Wellman's debut in the film industry)
 Frank Campeau as Crooked Sheriff
 Edythe Chapman as Teddy's Mother
 Albert MacQuarrie as Manual Lopez
 Ernest Butterworth

See also
 List of lost films

References

External links

 
 

1919 films
1919 romantic comedy films
1910s Western (genre) comedy films
American romantic comedy films
American black-and-white films
Famous Players-Lasky films
Films directed by Albert Parker
Films shot in Los Angeles
Lost Western (genre) comedy films
Lost American films
1919 lost films
Lost romantic comedy films
Silent American Western (genre) comedy films
1910s American films
Silent romantic comedy films
1910s English-language films